Gbandi (or Bandi, Bande, Gbande, Gbunde) is an ethnic group of Liberia. It is also the language traditionally spoken by these people.

Famous Gbandi Personalities:
Dr. Stephen A. Yekehson - Late ( professor and president of the University of Liberia).
Dr. Harry Fombah Moniba Late (Vice President Unser Samuel K. Doe)
Jackson Fombah Kanneh - Journalist ( for. Reporter for Voice Of America and Reuters News Agency.

People
The population is estimated at 107,000 people; of which many fled to Guinea during the Liberian Civil War. Gbandi people practice Islam and Christianity, as well as some traditional beliefs.

Language
Gbandi is a Southwestern Mande language. There are six dialects of the language: Tahamba, Wawana, Wulukoha, Hasala, Lukasa, and Hembeh.

References

Ethnic groups in Liberia
Ethnic groups in Guinea